Wilhelm Ringelband (1921–1981) was a German theater critic and endower of the Gertrud-Eysoldt-Ring. The actress Gertrud Eysoldt was a close friend and adviser to him. When Ringelband died, he left extensive archives of German film- and theatre history including a collection of pictures. The archive is located in Bensheim where Ringelband lived until his death.

References 
 Wilhelm Ringelband zu seinem fünfzigsten Geburtstag 7. Oktober 1971. Festschrift. [Bensheim]: Selbstverlag, 1971. 
 Carsten Niemann: „Das Herz meiner Künstlerschaft ist Mut“. Die Max-Reinhardt-Schauspielerin Gertrud Eysoldt. Hannover: Niedersächs. Staatstheater, 1995. (Prinzenstraße, Heft 6.)

External links
Ringelband-Stiftung (Deutsches Informationszentrum Kulturförderung)

1921 births
1981 deaths
German theatre critics
German male non-fiction writers